The Filbert (foaled in 1980) was a New Zealand bred race-horse that was a top performer in New Zealand and internationally at Group 1 level.

Racing career

The Filbert was trained by Don Couchman and Paul Belsham at Hawera.

After winning three races in his early New Zealand racing career, The Filbert had a successful trip to Australia winning at Rosehill on 17 October 1984 and Flemington on 10 November 1984.

His best wins were the 1985 New Zealand Stakes at Ellerslie and the 1986 Waikato Cup over 2400m at Te Rapa. He also had a number of placings in big races such as:

1985/86 season
 third in the Caulfield Stakes behind Tristarc.
 fourth in the Caulfield Cup behind Tristarc.
 fourth in the Cox Plate behind Rising Prince. 
 third in the Mackinnon Stakes behind Rising Prince. 
 third in the Japan Cup behind Symboli Rudolf and Rocky Tiger.

1986/87 season
 second in the Feehan Stakes behind Dazzling Duke.
 fourth in the Underwood Stakes behind Bonecrusher and At Talaq.
 fourth in the Caulfield Stakes behind Bonecrusher and Black Knight.
 third in the Cox Plate behind Bonecrusher and Waverley Star. This race became known as the Race of the Century.

See also

Thoroughbred racing in New Zealand

References 

The Filbert Horse Pedigree

Racehorses bred in New Zealand
Racehorses trained in New Zealand
1980 racehorse births